Hamburg-Rahlstedt station is a railway station in the Rahlstedt district in the city of Hamburg, Germany.

References

Rahlstedt